DXRM (95.9 FM), broadcasting as 95.9 Radyo Natin, is a radio station owned and operated by Manila Broadcasting Company. The station's studio is located in Brgy. Bag-ong Lungsod, Tandag.

References

Radio stations established in 1997
Radio stations in Surigao del Sur